Mozhi is a 2007 Indian Tamil language musical romantic comedy film written and directed by Radha Mohan and produced by Prakash Raj. The film stars Jyothika, Prithviraj, Prakash Raj, and Swarnamalya. The film's plot is about Karthik (Prithviraj), who works as a musician in films. He falls in love with a deaf and mute girl, Archana (Jyothika), but she considers him as her friend and disapproves of his love. The rest of the story revolves around Archana accepting Karthik's love.

The film was launched in 2006 and shot at several locations in India and Mauritius. Vidyasagar scored the music while lyrics were written by Vairamuthu. Mu. Kasivishwanathan handled the editing and K. V. Guhan worked as the cinematographer. The dialogues were written by Viji. The film was released on 23 February 2007 and emerged a critical and commercial success.

Reportedly, Jyothika reached the final round of National Film Award for Best Actress for her role, however she lost the award to Umashree for the Kannada film Gulabi Talkies. The film was dubbed in Telugu as Maatarani Mounamidi in 2012 and released to positive reviews.

Mozhi was the first Tamil film receiving the fastest launch in the home video market. The producers tied up with optical disc maker Moser Baer for the release. The film was premiered in the Non prize section of 2007 Cannes Film Festival.

Plot
Karthik (Prithviraj) and Vijayakumar alias Viji (Prakash Raj) are best friends who are keyboard players in music director Vidyasagar's team. They are brilliant in their work of rerecording and background scores. They are fun-loving, witty, and they share a great rapport. They come to live in an apartment complex building where they meet a handful of interesting people. Their irritable flat secretary, Ananthakrishnan (Brahmanandam), is not too happy about Karthik and Viji occupying the flat and asks him to vacate as bachelors are not allowed to live there. Preethi (Neelima Rani), a girl from one of those apartments, is head over heels in love with Karthik.

One day, Karthik sees a girl on the road and is quite impressed by her attitude and guts. Later, he finds out that the girl is Archana (Jyothika), a deaf and mute girl who lives in the same apartment with her grandmother. Karthik falls in love with her, and along with Viji, tries to find out more about her from her best friend Augustine Sheela (Swarnamalya). Karthik learns sign language from Sheela so that he can communicate with Archana. He wants to have her as his life partner, though she considers him as a good friend.

Archana gets angry with Karthik eventually when he proposes his love to her. She thinks that her baby will be disabled just like her. Her father abandoned her after he found out about her handicap, and she is afraid that Karthik will leave her as well if their baby is like her. Karthik tries to reason with her that her father was unaware of her condition, so it took him by surprise and he is ready to accept her and their future children because he knows and understands them. However, his pleas are to no avail. Archana begins avoiding Karthik, and Karthik is heartbroken.

A parallel plot involves Professor Gnanaprakasam (M. S. Bhaskar), who has lost his mental stability when his son Babu died. He refuses to accept the loss and lives in the year 1984, the year his son died. Later, Karthik helps him to break down and realize the grief of losing his son.

Ananthakrishnan also has an instance where he tries and fails to pursue a romantic relationship with a girl through various mishaps. He finally learns to like Karthik and Viji for who they are after Karthik helps Gnanaprakasam to come to his senses.

At the same time, Viji also falls in love with Sheela, who is a widow. Sheela and her parents agree to the marriage, and their marriage date is fixed. Archana decided not to attend the wedding as Karthik would be present, causing a rift between her and Sheela's friendship. This angers Karthik who confronts and tells to deal with her insecurities instead of hiding her true feelings like a coward. Breaking down to tears, Archana arrived on the wedding day and finally confesses to Karthik that she does indeed love him. The story thus concludes with a happy note of Viji and Sheela getting married and congratulating Karthik and Archana.

Cast

 Jyothika as Archana, a deaf and mute girl who grew up in an unloving environment. She is against love at first but later falls in love with Karthik.
 Prithviraj as Karthik/Babu, the protagonist who is on the path to discover love.
 Prakash Raj as Vijayakumar (Viji), Karthik's spontaneous and jovial friend who finds love accidentally.
 Swarnamalya as Angeline Sheela, Archana's best friend who is a widow and finds love in Viji.
 Brahmanandam as Ananthakrishnan, Karthik and Viji's irritable flat secretary who wants to evict Karthik and Viji from the apartment.
 M. S. Bhaskar as Professor Gnanaprakasam, a man who has lost his love when his son Babu died. He calls Karthik by his son's name.
 Neelima Rani as Preeti, an apartment resident who falls in love with Karthik.
 Vatsala Rajagopal as Archana's grandmother
 Sriranjini as Jaanu, Ananthakrishnan's wife
 Geetha Ravishankar as Professor Gnanaprakasam's wife
 E. V. Ganesh Babu as Pichumani
 Dhadi Balaji as Shanmugam, the apartment watchman 
 Muthukaalai as an abusive man who beats his wife
 Sangeetha Balan as the wife of the abusive man
 Ramya Subramanian as Pannaiyar's daughter (uncredited)

Production

Radhamohan revealed that idea of the film came from a little girl who stayed in his neighbourhood. He also told that he had Jyothika in his mind while writing down her character, she initially refused to act but later agreed after hearing the script.

Many actresses refused to play the character of Jyothika's friend, finally Swarnamalya was selected to play the role, Swarnamalya agreed after hearing the script which gave equal importance to women characters. Elango Kumaravel who earlier appeared in director's previous films did not acted in this film instead he worked as a dubbing artist lending his voice for Brahmanandam. Prithviraj was selected after director was impressed with his performance in Paarijatham. Prasanna was originally selected for the role which was eventually portrayed by Prakashraj.

Brahmanandam, Neelima Rani and M. S. Bhaskar were selected to portray supporting roles.

The film's climax was shot at the church called "Church of Our Lady of Angels" situated at Pondicherry.

Music

The soundtrack was composed by Vidyasagar. Acclaimed poet Vairamuthu has penned the lyrics for all the songs. The song "Kannal Pesum" is a modification of the song "Elamankanniloode... I Am Thinking of You" ("Walking in the Moonlight") from the Malayalam film Satyam Sivam Sundaram (2000). Vidyasagar gave the music for the Malayalam movie too. All the songs were well received especially "Kaatrin Mozhi" and "Sevvanam".

A segment of Harry Belafonte's version of the popular Jewish folk song Hava Nagila is played during the comedy scene between Prakash Raj and Brahmanandam.

The audio was released on 2 February 2007 at Sathyam Cinemas in Chennai. The album received positive reviews from critics. Indiaglitz praised the soundtrack stating that: "To put it simply, Vidyasagar has given music as much for your soul as he has done for your ears".

Release
The film was released on 23 February 2007. The film's official website was created by entertainment portal Indiaglitz.

N Achyutha Kantha Rao of Indus Inspirations purchased the theatrical rights of Telugu dubbed version. The film was released in Telugu under the title Maataranai Mounamidi.

Home media
Mozhi has been released in VCDs and DVDs by Moser Baer Home Video. The satellite rights of the film were sold to Kalaignar TV and it was premiered on channel's launch date 15 September 2007.

Reception

Critical reception
Mozhi received positive critical acclaim for its clean content, performance and music. Sify wrote, "Director Radha Mohan has once again proved that he can make a pucca family entertainer with characters that you can relate to. Mozhi is indeed gutsy, feel-good, real solid movie within the framework of commercial cinema." Now running wrote, "Mozhi is not a regular masala flick but a straightforward, heartbreaking and refined tale of love. The power of this film resides in its story, strong and believable narration, genuine sadness and tour-de-force performance by all central characters — Prithviraj, Jyothika, and Prakash Raj". Indiaglitz praised the film stating that: "Mozhi is a clean entertainer that justifies the tagline that is found in the promotional materials of the film. "It is not the expression, but the emotion". Behindwoods wrote: "Radha Mohan does it once again. His uncompromising attitude in delivering a neat and family entertainer is remarkable". Rediff wrote: "Mozhi is a groundbreaking movie for Tamil cinema in many ways. It does not over-sentimentalise physical handicaps [..] The story is no-nonsense and without any unnecessary frills. Strong characterisation and excellent performances from the cast make this truly a remarkable film". Hindu wrote:"Mozhi is surely a film its producer can be proud of [..] Conceiving a simple yet poignant line, creating a screenplay that takes you along smoothly, and helming it, director Radha Mohan presents 'Mozhi' with panache".

Rajinikanth praised the film stating that such films make him feel proud and happy that he is part of the Tamil film fraternity.

Box-office

Released on 23 February 2007, Mozhi faced competition from Paruthiveeran, which was released on the same day. The film took a big opening at the Chennai box office, The film continued to rank at first at the Chennai box office for five successive weeks, being ousted only by the Hollywood production 300 during the Easter weekend. The film was produced on a budget of $500,000 and it became a surprise hit grossing $2 million and declared one of the most commercially successful Tamil films of the year. The positive response of the film has led to the generation of additional prints. The film completed a theatrical run of 100 days. The film's 100-day function was held in the open air club house attached to Mayajaal multiplex on the ECR. Anjali Arora, a visually challenged lawyer, working as a legal advisor to the Ministry of Civil Aviation, Balu Mahendra, Ameer, Lingusamy and Sundar.C attended the function.

Legacy
Mozhi became an important film in the career of Prithviraj and Jyothika. The film proved that the people would accept stories based on disability if the film was presented in a new and innovative way. The film continued the trend of films with different themes that focused on realism. K. Jeshi of The Hindu placed the film in the category of films that propagate social issues along with other films like Sethu (1999), Kaadhal (2004), Veyil (2006), Imsai Arasan 23am Pulikesi (2006) and Paruthiveeran (2007). Behindwoods stated that humour helped the film "to become one of the biggest money-spinners in Kollywood" and also added "Prakash Raj's witty dialogues ensured a merry go ride".

Director Mahendran listed Mozhi as one of his favourite films. Documentary filmmaker Swarnavel says films such as Kaadhal, Veyil, Mozhi and Paruthi Veeran have pushed the envelope of mainstream Tamil cinema. Actress Revathi stated that: "young film makers in particular have come up with some wonderful, well-researched movies featuring disability, such as Mozhi, Black, Deiva Thirumagal, Beautiful, and many others. These films, with their accurate detailing and brilliant portrayals don't paint disability as a tragedy, but show it as a part of life". In an interview to Times of India in 2008, Keerthi Chawla revealed that: "I'm looking for a role on the lines of the one played by Jyotika in Mozhi and Sridevi in Moondram Pirai". P. B. Ramasamy, head of Big FM, Chennai told to Hindu that: "Mozhi was a wholesome entertainer and I never got bored even for a minute. The movie made me smile throughout and for the first time while watching a film, I felt the urge to watch it all over again". Dancer Shweta Prachande who portrayed deaf and dumb character in a short film called Notes of Silence said she was inspired by Jothika's performance from the film to portray the character.

Scenes from the film have been parodied in Thamizh Padam (2010). Shiva's love signals, Disha Pandey's introduction scene and her friend character has been based on the film. The song "Kaatrin Mozhi" inspired a film of the same name, which was also directed by Radha Mohan.

Accolades
At the 55th National Film Awards according to Sibi Malayil, one of the jury member of feature film, Jyothika was one of the front runner for National Film Award for Best Actress, along with Meera Jasmine for the Malayalam film Ore Kadal and Umashree for the Kannada film Gulabi Talkies. However, she lost the award to Umashree who was adjudged the Best Actress.

2007 Vijay Awards
 Won - Best Supporting Actor - Prakash Raj
 Won - Best Story, Screenplay Writer - Viji
 Nominated - Best Film - Prakash Raj
 Nominated - Best Actress - Jyothika

2007 Tamil Nadu State Film Awards
 Won - Best Second Feature Film - Prakash Raj
 Won - Best Actress - Jyothika
 Won - Best Music Director - Vidyasagar

55th Filmfare Awards South
 Won - Best Tamil Male Playback Singer - S. P. Balasubrahmanyam for "Kannal Pesum Penne"
 Nominated - Best Tamil Film - Prakash Raj
 Nominated - Best Tamil Director - Radha Mohan
 Nominated - Best Tamil Actress - Jyothika

Dropped remake
Boney Kapoor has acquired the Hindi remake rights of the film in 2008. According to initial reports Abhishek Bachchan is considered to do the lead role that Prithviraj had done with considerable ease while Asin Thottumkal is earmarked to do the potential dumb and mute act of the female lead, which was done by Jyothika in the original. Radhamohan himself would direct the remake, however it failed to materialize.

References

External links

2007 films
Films about disability in India
Films shot in Mauritius
2007 romantic drama films
Films scored by Vidyasagar
2000s Tamil-language films
Indian romantic drama films
Films shot in Puducherry
Films directed by Radha Mohan
Indian Sign Language films